Yucef Merhi (born February 8, 1977) is a Venezuelan artist, poet and computer programmer based in New York.

Early life
Yucef Merhi was born in Caracas, Venezuela. He studied at Universidad Central de Venezuela, New School University, and holds a Master's in Interactive Telecommunications from New York University.

Art career
Merhi has produced a variety of works that engage electronic circuits, computers, video game systems, touch screens, and other devices in the presentation of his written words. One example is Poetic Clock, a machine that converts time into poetry, generating 86,400 different poems daily. The resulting artworks expand the limitations of language and the traditional context of poetry. His 2012 commissioned work for the Los Angeles County Museum of Art, Quetzalcoatl 2.0.1.2., was a web-based work that "aims to reveal the voice of Quetzalcoatl in the technological reality of 2012 A.D."

Exhibitions

New Museum of Contemporary Art; *Bronx Museum of the Arts; 
El Museo del Barrio;
Eyebeam Art and Technology Center  
Exit Art, 
Newark Museum 
Orange County Museum of Art, California
Los Angeles County Museum of Art 
De Appel (Amsterdam); Haus der Kulturen der Welt 
Museo Michetti, Rome 
Borusan Culture & Art Center, Istanbul; Paço das Artes 
Museo del Chopo, Mexico DF 
Museo de Arte Contemporáneo de Yucatán, Yucatán 
Museo de Bellas Artes, Caracas (Caracas); Museo de Arte Contemporáneo 
Science World, Vancouver 
7th International Festival of New Film, Split, Croatia 
2007 Bienal de São Paulo – Valencia
10th Istanbul Biennial and the 30th Ljubljana Biennial of Graphic Arts.

Permanent collections
Orange County Museum of Art California 
National Art Gallery, Caracas 
Library of Congress, Washington  
Mednarodni Grafični Likovni Center MGLC, Ljubljana
Museo Alejandro Otero, Caracas 
Museo de Arte Contemporáneo de Caracas
Museo de Arte Valencia Valencia

Awards
New York Foundation for the Arts in Digital/Electronic Arts

References

External links

1977 births
Living people
People from Caracas
Venezuelan male poets
Venezuelan artists
New media artists
Venezuelan contemporary artists
Art curators
Electronic literature writers